Procor is a Canadian company producing railway shipping cars. It is Canada's largest private rail car rental fleet, with more than 30,000 conventional and special-purpose tank and freight cars. 

Linked to Sparling Tank Car of Toronto, Procor was founded in 1952 as Products Tank Line Limited and became an affiliate of US-based Union Tank Car Company.  The company, which shortened its name to Procor in 1962, is headquartered in Oakville, Ontario.

Manufacturing and Repair
Procor manufactured cars in its Oakville shops until 2002, but now sources from parent Union Tank Car's plant in Alexandria, Louisiana and Sheldon, Texas.

List of cars once manufactured by Procor:

 Hopper car
 Tank car - (sulphuric acid, LPG, ethanol)
 Funnel flow tank car
 Coal gondola

Procor operates from numerous locations across Canada.

Repair Shops
 Joffre, Alberta
 Edmonton, Alberta
 Regina, Saskatchewan
 Sarnia, Ontario
 Oakville, Ontario

Mobile/mini shops
 Regina West
 Prince George, British Columbia
 North Vancouver, British Columbia
 Trail, British Columbia
 Waterton, Alberta
 Joffre, Alberta
 Edmonton, Alberta
 Winnipeg, Manitoba
 Greater Sudbury, Ontario
 Nanticoke, Ontario
 Montreal, Quebec

See also

 Horbury railway works - Procor's British unit from 1974 to 1990

References

External links
 PROCOR Corporate Site
 PROCOR Railcar Gallery

Rolling stock manufacturers of Canada
1952 establishments in Ontario